Luka Malešević (born 1 August 1998) is a Montenegrin professional footballer who plays as an defender for OFK Petrovac.

Career
Malešević began his career with Budućnost Podgorica, making his only senior appearance for the club in 2016. He spent time on loan with Montenegrin Second League club Mornar Bar between 2016 and 2018. In 2018, he made the move to Iskra Danilovgrad, where he made 87 appearances in all competitions and played with Iskra in their UEFA Europa League qualifying matches.

In 2021, Malešević signed a three-and-a-half year deal with Serbian SuperLiga side Radnik Surdulica, but he and the club mutually agreed to terminate his deal at the club on 25 November 2021.

On 2 March 2022, he moved to the United States, where he holds citizenship, signing with USL Championship club Rio Grande Valley FC.

Personal
Malešević also holds American citizenship.

References

1998 births
Living people
Association football defenders
FK Budućnost Podgorica players
FK Mornar players
FK Iskra Danilovgrad players
FK Radnik Surdulica players
Expatriate soccer players in the United States
Montenegrin expatriate footballers
Montenegrin expatriate sportspeople in the United States
Montenegrin footballers
Montenegrin First League players
Montenegrin Second League players
Montenegro youth international footballers
OFK Petrovac players
Rio Grande Valley FC Toros players
Serbian SuperLiga players
USL Championship players